György Margó (15 May 1912 – 9 November 1988) was a Hungarian field hockey and ice hockey player who competed in the 1936 Summer Olympics. He was born and died in Budapest.

In 1936 he was a member of the Hungarian team which was eliminated in the group stage of the Olympic tournament. He played two matches as forward.

External links
 
profile

1912 births
1988 deaths
Hungarian male field hockey players
Olympic field hockey players of Hungary
Field hockey players at the 1936 Summer Olympics
Sportspeople from Budapest

Hungarian ice hockey players
20th-century Hungarian people